Beach School is a historic building located northwest of Mount Vernon, Iowa, United States.  Because school district lines had been redrawn, students in this area were forced to attend classes in a building some distance away.  Given the condition of rural roads in the late 19th century, that created a hardship for many families.  From 1889 to 1891 the school district set aside funds for a new building, and Benjamin Beach donated land on his farm for the new school.  Not only was his farmhouse nearby, but Beach also operated a sawmill along the creek east of the school and a gristmill across the road.  The one-room schoolhouse was completed in 1892, and a bell was purchased for the building around 1901.  Early drawings of the building show a small bell tower.  The building was used for educational and social use until 1946, and it has subsequently been converted into a rental home.  It was listed on the National Register of Historic Places in 1982.

References

School buildings completed in 1892
One-room schoolhouses in Iowa
Houses in Linn County, Iowa
National Register of Historic Places in Linn County, Iowa
School buildings on the National Register of Historic Places in Iowa